The 2008 Slovak Cup Final was the final match of the 2007–08 Slovak Cup, the 39th season of the top cup competition in Slovak football. The match was played at the Štadión pod Dubňom in Žilina on 1 May 2008 between FC Artmedia Petržalka and FC Spartak Trnava. Artmedia defeated Spartak Trnava 1-0.

Route to the final

Match

Details

References

Slovak Cup Finals
Slovak Cup
Slovak Cup
Cup Final